On 31 August 2019, nine people were stabbed by an Afghan asylum-seeker One of the victims died and two remain hospitalized. The attack happened outside a subway station in Lyon, France. The police are not investigating the attack as terrorism, but told police he was Muslim and heard voices that were insulting god. Several witnesses also recalled the attacker shouting religious words.

An intervening bus driver prevented the attacker from entering the metro which stopped further carnage.

Victims 
A 19-year-old man was stabbed and killed and eight were wounded by the attacker.

References 

2019 crimes in France
2019 stabbings
August 2019 crimes in Europe
August 2019 events in France
2019 stabbings
Stabbing attacks in 2019
Stabbing attacks in France
Violence in France